Mochammad Al Amin Syukur Fisabillah (born 10 May 1995 in Bontang) is an Indonesian professional footballer who plays as a centre-back for club Liga 1 club Persik Kediri.

Club career

Kalteng Putra
He was signed for Kalteng Putra to play in Liga 2 in the 2020 season. Despite the 2020 season being canceled after one match due to the COVID-19 pandemic.

Persik Kediri
In 2021, Sabil signed a contract with Indonesian Liga 1 club Persik Kediri. He made his league debut on 14 January 2022 against Persikabo 1973 at the Ngurah Rai Stadium, Denpasar.

PSMS Medan (loan)
In 2021, Sabil signed a contract with Indonesian Liga 2 club PSMS Medan, on loan from Persik Kediri. He made his league debut on 7 October against KS Tiga Naga at the Gelora Sriwijaya Stadium, Palembang.

References

External links 
 Mochamad Sabillah at Soccerway
 Mochamad Sabillah at Liga Indonesia

1995 births
Indonesian footballers
Living people
Persijap Jepara players
PSIM Yogyakarta players
Persibat Batang players
Persib Bandung players
Badak Lampung F.C. players
Kalteng Putra F.C. players
Persik Kediri players
PSMS Medan players
Liga 2 (Indonesia) players
Liga 1 (Indonesia) players
Association football defenders
People from Bontang
Sportspeople from East Kalimantan